The 1957 Cal Poly Pomona Broncos football team represented the Cal Poly Kellogg-Voorhis Unit—now known as California State Polytechnic University, Pomona—as an independent during the 1957 NCAA College Division football season. Led by first-year head coach Don Warhurst, Cal Poly Pomona compiled a record of 7–1–1. The team outscored its opponents 254 to 139 for the season. The Broncos played home games in Pomona, California.

Schedule

Notes

References

Cal Poly Pomona
Cal Poly Pomona Broncos football seasons
Cal Poly Pomona Broncos football